Martin Baker (born 26 July 1967, Manchester) is a past President of the Royal College of Organists, and was from 2000 until 2019 Master of Music at Westminster Cathedral.

Baker was educated at the Royal Northern College of Music Junior School, Chetham's School of Music, St Ambrose College, and attended Downing College, Cambridge as an Organ Scholar from 1985–88.  He subsequently held appointments at Westminster Cathedral (Organ Scholar 1988–90), St Paul's Cathedral (Assistant Organist 1990–1991) and Westminster Abbey (Sub-Organist 1992–98 and Acting Organist 1998–99.)

Baker won first prize in the Improvisation Competition at the St Albans International Organ Festival in 1997. While his position at Westminster Cathedral was primarily focused on choral direction, he maintains an international profile as an organ recitalist, and is known particularly for his skill in organ improvisation.

In 2015 Baker was elected as an Honorary Fellow of Downing College.

References

External links
Martin Baker at the Westminster Cathedral website
[ Martin Baker] at Allmusic
Martin Baker USA management page

1967 births
Living people
Alumni of Downing College, Cambridge
Cathedral organists
English choral conductors
British male conductors (music)
English organists
British male organists
Fellows of Downing College, Cambridge
Musicians from Manchester
People educated at St. Ambrose College
People educated at Chetham's School of Music
21st-century British conductors (music)
21st-century organists
21st-century British male musicians
Male classical organists